Jeffery Harness (born April 8, 1978) is an American attorney and politician serving as a member of the Mississippi House of Representatives from the 85th district. Elected in November 2018, he assumed office on December 21, 2018.

Early life and education 
Harness was born in McComb, Mississippi. After graduating from Jefferson County High School, he earned a Bachelor of Science degree in agricultural economics and a Master of Science in secondary education from Alcorn State University, followed by a Juris Doctor from the Southern University Law Center.

Career 
Since January 2012, Harness has owned and operated an independent law firm. He was elected to the Mississippi House of Representatives in November 2020 and assumed office on December 21, 2018.

References 

1978 births
Living people
People from McComb, Mississippi
Alcorn State University alumni
Southern University Law Center alumni
Democratic Party members of the Mississippi House of Representatives
Mississippi lawyers
African-American state legislators in Mississippi
21st-century African-American people
20th-century African-American people